The 2019 ACC Western Region T20 was a Twenty20 International (T20I) cricket tournament held in Oman from 20 to 24 January 2019. The five participating teams were Bahrain, Kuwait, Maldives, Qatar and Saudi Arabia. The matches were all played at the Al Amerat Cricket Stadium in Muscat. All participating nations made their T20I debuts during the tournament, following the decision of the ICC to grant full Twenty20 International status to all its members from 1 January 2019. Saudi Arabia defeated Qatar – who had been unbeaten in the round-robin stage – in the final by 7 wickets. Qatar's Tamoor Sajjad was named the player of the tournament.

Round-robin

Points table
{| class="wikitable" style="text-align:center"
|-
! style="width:175px;"|Team
! style="width:20px;"|
! style="width:20px;"|
! style="width:20px;"|
! style="width:20px;"|
! style="width:20px;"|
! style="width:20px;"|
! style="width:65px;"|
|- style="background:#cfc;"
| style="text-align:left" | 
| 4 || 4 || 0 || 0 || 0 || 8 || +1.694
|- style="background:#cfc;"
| style="text-align:left" | 
| 4 || 2 || 2 || 0 || 0 || 4 || +0.489 
|- 
| style="text-align:left" | 
| 4 || 2 || 2 || 0 || 0 || 4 || –0.035
|- 
| style="text-align:left" | 
| 4 || 2 || 2 || 0 || 0 || 4 || –0.060
|- 
| style="text-align:left" | 
| 4 || 0 || 4 || 0 || 0 || 0 || –2.075
|}

Matches

Final

References

International cricket competitions in 2018–19
Twenty20 International cricket competitions
International cricket competitions in Oman